The following is a list of Marquette Golden Eagles men's basketball head coaches. There have been 18 head coaches of the Golden Eagles in their 106-season history.

Marquette's current head coach is Shaka Smart. He was hired as the Golden Eagles' head coach in March 2021, replacing Steve Wojciechowski, who was fired after the 2020–21 season.

References

Marquette

Marquette Golden Eagles basketball, men's, coaches